Minetest is a free and open-source sandbox video game and game creation system with focus on voxel graphics. It is written primarily in C++ and makes use of the Irrlicht Engine. Minetest provides an API for users to write their own games and mods written in Lua. It is cross-platform, being available for Linux-based systems, FreeBSD, Microsoft Windows, MacOS, and Android.

In the default game of Minetest, Minetest Game (MTG for short), players explore a blocky, procedurally-generated 3D world spanning approximately 31 000 full nodes (blocks) in each direction, and may discover and extract raw materials, craft tools and items, and build structures and landscapes. Depending on the game selected and mods present, players can fight computer-controlled "mobs", as well as cooperate with or compete against other players in the same world.

The game mechanics of Minetest are similar to those of the 2009 game Minecraft, though the original author stopped just short of describing it as a "Minecraft clone". Over a decade of active development Minetest has garnered critical acclaim and gained in popularity; since November 2013 Minetest has been downloaded over 1.4 million times from GitHub, and the Android version of Minetest has over 500,000 downloads on the Google Play store.

Gameplay 

Minetest is a voxel sandbox video game. Gameplay is in the first-person perspective by default, but players have the option for third-person perspective. The game world is composed of voxels: 3D objects, many of them simple cubes, commonly called "nodes". Different voxels represent various materials, such as dirt, stone, ores, tree trunks, water, and lava. The core gameplay revolves around picking up and placing these objects, one node at a time. Nodes are arranged in a 3D grid, while players can move smoothly around the world. Players can "mine" (or "dig") blocks and then "place" (or "build") them elsewhere, enabling them to modify the game world. Players can also craft a wide variety of hand-held tools to aid them with the world modification. Pick axes allow to dig rocky nodes, shovels speed up the digging of dirt and sand, water buckets allow to pick up water nodes, etc. A player controls a 3D character known as Sam, which is a recursive acronym for "Sam ain't Minecraft".

As players explore the world, new areas are procedurally generated, using a map seed specified by the player. A new game puts the player in the center of a voxel cube 62 thousand nodes across, so the player can travel 31 thousand nodes in any direction (sideways, up, or down) before reaching the invisible wall at the end of the world.

The world is divided into biomes ranging from deserts to jungles to snowfields; the terrain includes plains, mountains, forests, caves, and various lava/water bodies. The in-game time system follows a day and night cycle, and one full cycle lasts 20 real-time minutes.

Minetest provides two basic game mode options: Enable Damage and Creative Mode which affect how players interact with the world and use items. Creative Mode is intended to provide players with infinite resources, while toggling the damage setting determines whether the players are able to take damage from environmental hazards and other players.

Multiplayer 
Minetest implements a client-server architecture, and can be played solo or multiplayer. A player starting a new game can choose between playing in a single-player mode, or hosting a server to which other Minetest players can connect.

Customizations 

The full source code of Minetest, and all of its artistic assets such as textures and sounds, are distributed under a variety of free licenses, making it easier to create modified versions and derivatives. The base version of Minetest provides an interface for games and mods written in Lua. Games define the basic rules of the game world, and are a core feature of Minetest. Most games feature sandbox gameplay focused on construction, mining, and creativity. Mods are used to further customize various aspects of gameplay, and are an inherent part of Minetest. Mods are server-side and work out of the box when playing on Internet servers, with no manual installation required.

Games 
Developers refer to Minetest as an engine rather than a "game" because almost every aspect of gameplay is implemented within so-called games written in Lua. Since version 5.0.0, the main menu of the Minetest engine allows users to browse and install games from a curated list.

Minetest is shipped with two games: Minetest Game, a sandbox, and Development Test implementing a more minimal sandbox primarily for debugging. Minetest Game implements a simple and peaceful game mode with no goals and no built-in computer enemies.

Mods 
There are over 1000 free and open-source mods available at Minetest forums. Since version 5.0.0, Minetest features a built-in content picker, allowing users to browse a curated list of add-ons and install mods and texture packs with a single click. Content is also available at Minetest's site ContentDB. Mods can be used to add node types, tools, monsters, player skins, and alter many aspects of the gameplay. Both the forums and the in-game browser exclude non-free or closed source software as a matter of policy.

Development 

Minetest was originally released in November 2010 under a proprietary license. Shortly afterwards the license was changed to the GPL-2.0-or-later license. By agreement among major contributors, in June 2012 the project license was to be changed to LGPL-2.1-or-later, though at the time small parts still remained under the GPL-2.0-or-later license. In September 2013, the transition was complete. While LGPL-2.1-or-later remains the main license for the Minetest engine, other free and open-source licenses are used for various other parts of the latest release.

Perttu Ahola was the only developer working on the project for about six months, until Ciaran Gultnieks started making code contributions in May 2011. The roster of contributors grew and changed over the years. As of July 2020, there are 9 active core developers and 15 active contributors. Project participants do not have set roles, but rather keep their activity within their respective areas of expertise. Perttu Ahola's role morphed over the years: whereas initially it was engine development, now it is mostly Web-hosting and administration, assigning core developer, moderator, and other roles to people, as well as being the final word in cases where other developers are unable to render a decision.

Usage in education 
Minetest has been used in educational environments to teach subjects such as mathematics, programming, and earth sciences. Such examples are:

 In 2017 in France, Minetest was used to teach calculus and trigonometry.
 At Federal University of Santa Catarina in Brazil, Minetest was used to teach programming in a variant called MineScratch.
 In 2018, for Laboratory Education and Apprenticeships (EDA) at the Paris Descartes University, Minetest was used to teach life and earth sciences to year 6 students who could not observe some phenomena in person but could experience them in the Minetest virtual world.

Reception 
Opensource.com listed Minetest at #1 in its "Best open source games of 2015", stating that it is maybe "the most complete alternative to Minecraft", and noted its expansibility, stating that it contains a user-friendly API for creating mods in Lua. PC Magazine listed Minetest among "The best Sandbox Creation Games for Minecraft Fans".

See also 

 Free and open source software
 List of open-source video games
 Linux gaming

References 

Survival video games
Linux games
Windows games
Android (operating system) games
Multiplayer online games
Open-source video games
Open-world video games
Free and open-source software
Free and open-source Android software
MacOS games
Multiplayer and single-player video games
Video games developed in Finland
2010 video games
Minecraft clones
Lua (programming language)-scripted video games